Sou Soi Lam (born 14 September 1989) is a Macau karateka. She won the silver medal in the women's kata event at the 2018 Asian Games held in Jakarta, Indonesia. In the same year, she also competed in the women's individual kata event at the 2018 World Karate Championships held in Madrid, Spain.

She lost her bronze medal match at the 2022 Asian Karate Championships held in Tashkent, Uzbekistan.

Achievements

References 

Living people
1989 births
Place of birth missing (living people)
Macau female karateka
Karateka at the 2018 Asian Games
Asian Games medalists in karate
Asian Games silver medalists for Macau
Medalists at the 2018 Asian Games